Rips the Covers Off, some copies of which are titled Rips Off the Covers, is an album by Phil Lewis's version of L.A. Guns, their first with guitarist Stacey Blades.

The studio portion of the album (songs 1-11) consists of cover songs with guitarist Stacey Blades, though songs 12 and 13 are live versions of "Revolution" and "Don't Look at Me That Way", with guitarists Keri Kelli and Brent Muscat.

A different line-up of L.A. Guns had previously recorded a cover of Led Zeppelin's "Custard Pie" on Hollywood Rehearsal.

Track listing
 "Rock 'n' Roll Outlaw" (Rose Tattoo cover)
 "I Just Want to Make Love to You" (Muddy Waters cover)
 "Tie Your Mother Down" (Queen cover)
 "Until I Get You" (Hanoi Rocks cover)
 "Wheels of Steel" (Saxon cover)
 "Nobody's Fault" (Aerosmith cover)
 "Custard Pie" (Led Zeppelin cover)
 "Moonage Daydream" (David Bowie cover)
 "Marseilles" (Angel City cover)
 "Hurdy Gurdy Man" (Donovan cover)
 "Search and Destroy" (The Stooges cover)
 "Revolution" (Live)
 "Don't Look at Me That Way" (Live)

Lineup
Tracks 1-11
 Phil Lewis - lead vocals
 Stacey Blades - guitar
 Adam Hamilton - bass guitar
 Steve Riley - drums

Tracks 12-13
Phil Lewis - lead vocals
Keri Kelli - guitar
Brent Muscat - guitar
Adam Hamilton - bass guitar
Steve Riley - drums

References

2004 albums
L.A. Guns albums
Covers albums